The Korean War Veterans Parkway is a parkway that traverses the South Shore of Staten Island, New York, in the United States. It begins at the Outerbridge Crossing toll plaza and runs from southwest to northeast to a merge with Drumgoole Road in the island's Greenridge section. The parkway is designated New York State Route 909C (NY 909C), an unsigned reference route, which continues northeast along Drumgoole Road for a short distance to its end at an intersection with Richmond Avenue. The westernmost  of the parkway overlaps with NY 440.

The parkway opened in 1972 as the Richmond Parkway. It was renamed the Korean War Veterans Parkway in 1997; however, the highway is still widely known as Richmond Parkway.

As originally planned, the parkway would have continued northeast to an interchange with Interstate 278 in Sunnyside, and would have also connected to Wolfe's Pond Park on Staten Island's South Shore by way of a spur known as Wolfe's Pond Parkway. The section of the Richmond Parkway east of Richmond Avenue was canceled sometime after the 1960s as a result of community opposition; likewise, Wolfe's Pond Parkway was canceled in the 1970s. Today, the part of the Staten Island Greenbelt where the parkway would have run is still known as Richmond Parkway.

Route description

The Korean War Veterans Parkway begins concurrent with NY 440 at the Outerbridge Crossing toll plaza east of the New Jersey state line on Staten Island. NY 440 and the parkway remain overlapped to Pleasant Plains, where NY 440 splits from the parkway and heads north on the West Shore Expressway. Past NY 440, the four-lane parkway gains frontage roads as Drumgoole Road begins to run along both sides of the highway. Not far to the east, the parkway runs along the southern edge of Bloomingdale Park and connects to Maguire Avenue by way of ramps leading to and from Drumgoole Road. The parkway continues slightly northeastward through Pleasant Plains to Huguenot, serving Huguenot Avenue with southbound exit and northbound entrance ramps.

From Huguenot Avenue, the highway takes a more pronounced northeasterly track through the neighborhoods of Woodrow and Annadale, meeting Arden Avenue by way of an interchange in the latter community. The parkway continues as a four-lane limited-access highway to Greenridge, where the road merges with the northern half of Drumgoole Road to create a four-lane, two-way surface street with a Jersey barrier in the median. The Korean War Veterans Parkway ends at the merge; however, NY 909C, the unsigned reference route designation for the parkway, continues to follow Drumgoole Road to its end a short distance later at an intersection with Richmond Avenue. Stubs intended to continue both directions of the parkway past Greenridge are present at the merge with Drumgoole Road. The unused highways roughly parallel Drumgoole Road, crossing over Richmond Avenue before abruptly becoming a small two-lane road just east of the overpasses. The road continues as a non-public asphalt roadway used for construction vehicles.

History
{
  "type": "ExternalData",
  "service": "page",
  "title": "Richmond Parkway Extension.map"
}
The parkway that exists today represents less than half of the highway that was originally planned. From Richmond Avenue, the parkway would have continued northeast to Staten Island's Sunnyside neighborhood, where it would connect to the Staten Island Expressway. The  section west of Richmond Avenue was constructed along Drumgoole Road from 1966 to 1972 and opened to traffic in late 1972. As a result, the parkway's one-way service roads were named Drumgoole Road East and Drumgoole Road West. Drumgoole Road itself was named for Father John Drumgoole, the Irish-born founder of the Mission of the Immaculate Virgin, a Roman Catholic orphanage better known today as Mount Loretto.

In the late 1960s, intense community opposition erupted over the portion east of Richmond Avenue—much of it from environmentalists—because the parkway's planned route would have bisected the Staten Island Greenbelt and would have required the condemnation and razing of miles of private property. The  section of the parkway between Richmond Avenue and the proposed Staten Island Expressway interchange ended up never being built, and the route was subsequently demapped. From time to time, proposals have been made to revive the aborted section of the parkway in response to steadily increasing traffic congestion on Staten Island. However, none of these proposals have received significant support from the island's elected officials or residents.

Robert Moses had an interchange built at the junction with the Staten Island Expressway (I-278) in Todt Hill, with the intention of using it for the terminus of the Richmond Parkway. However, this never came to be finished and the interchange was demolished in 2012 as part of a project to widen the Staten Island Expressway.

Wolfe's Pond Parkway, a spur route connecting Richmond Parkway to Wolfe's Pond Park on Staten Island's South Shore, was proposed by Robert Moses in 1941. The highway never advanced past the planning stage, and it was ultimately cancelled in the 1970s.

In 1997, the Richmond Parkway was renamed the Korean War Veterans Memorial Parkway; however, when signs announcing the change were erected, the word "Memorial" was inadvertently omitted.

Exit list

See also

References

External links

Veterans Parkway
Parkways in New York City
Transportation in Staten Island
Military monuments and memorials in the United States
United States in the Korean War
Unfinished buildings and structures in the United States